The men's 50 kilometres walk event at the 2007 World Championships in Athletics took place on 1 September 2007 in the streets of Osaka, Japan.



Medallists

Abbreviations
All times shown are in hours:minutes:seconds

Records

Final ranking

See also
Athletics at the 2007 Pan American Games - Men's 50 kilometres walk

References
Full results - IAAF.org
Event report - IAAF.org

50 kilometres walk
Racewalking at the World Athletics Championships